Leslie Lloyd Rees (properly surnamed Lloyd-Rees, but sometimes called Rees; 14 April 19194 July 2013) was variously Honorary Chaplain to the Queen, Chaplain-General of Prisons and Anglican Bishop of Shrewsbury.

Rees was educated at Kelham Theological College. He was made deacon at Michaelmas 1942 (20 September) and ordained priest the Michaelmas following (18 September 1943) — both times by John Morgan, Bishop of Llandaff at Llandaff Cathedral. after a brief curacy at St Saviour, Roath, he embarked on a long career as a Prison Chaplain: he was successively Chaplain at Cardiff, Durham, Dartmoor and Winchester. In 1962 he was appointed to the head of the service (Chaplain-General of Prisons), a post he held until his appointment to the episcopate 18 years later. He was also appointed honorary Canon of Canterbury Cathedral in 1966. He was consecrated a bishop on 3 November 1980, by Robert Runcie, Archbishop of Canterbury, at Westminster Abbey. He became a 
Chaplain of the Order of St John (ChStJ).

In retirement he was an honorary assistant bishop in the Diocese of Winchester, having settled in Alresford, Hampshire. and served as a member of the Parole Board for England and Wales from 1987 to 1990.

Later in retirement he moved to a retirement home at Blackwater, Isle of Wight where he died in July 2013, aged 94.

References

 

1919 births
2013 deaths
20th-century Church of England bishops
Alumni of Kelham Theological College
Anglican bishops of Shrewsbury
Honorary Chaplains to the Queen
Chaplains-General of Prisons
Chaplains of the Order of St John